L1551 IRS 5 is a protostellar envelope surrounding a binary protostar system in the constellation of Taurus 450 light-years from Earth.  The binary system itself is known as L1551 NE, and each star is surrounded by protoplanetary disk. The system is one of Jim Kaler's The 100 greatest stars.

The binary is surrounded by a complex, gas-rich protoplanetary disk system.

References

External links
 L1551 IRS 5: A curious case of a young and active binary star

Herbig–Haro objects
Taurus (constellation)
FU Orionis stars
Spectroscopic binaries
J04313407+1808049
IRAS catalogue objects